Rajnagar Legislative Assembly constituency is one of the 60 Legislative Assembly constituencies of Tripura state in India.

It is part of South Tripura district and is reserved for candidates belonging to the Scheduled Castes.

Members of the Legislative Assembly

Election results

2018

See also
 List of constituencies of the Tripura Legislative Assembly
 South Tripura district

References

South Tripura district
Assembly constituencies of Tripura